Anolis chamaeleonides, the short-bearded anole, is a species of lizard in the family Dactyloidae. The species is found in Cuba.

References

Anoles
Endemic fauna of Cuba
Reptiles of Cuba
Reptiles described in 1837
Taxa named by André Marie Constant Duméril
Taxa named by Gabriel Bibron